The 2011 Fusagasugá City Council election was held on Sunday, 30 October 2011, to elect the third City Council since the 2002 reform (Legislative Act 2002). At stake were all 17 seats in the City Council.

Results

Aldermen election 
On Fusagasugá is divided six comunes and five townships, every commune and township elect seven aldermen who conform the Local Administrator Council. The table shows the potential voters for every district.

References 

2011
Regional elections